An Armstrong gun was a uniquely designed type of rifled breech-loading field and heavy gun designed by Sir William Armstrong and manufactured in England beginning in 1855 by the Elswick Ordnance Company and the Royal Arsenal at Woolwich. Such guns involved a built-up gun construction system of a wrought-iron (later of mild steel) tube surrounded by a number of wrought-iron strengthening coils shrunk over the inner tube to keep it under compression.

The Armstrong rifled breechloading guns of the 1850s-1860s
In 1854, Armstrong approached the Secretary of State for War, proposing that he construct a rifled breech-loading 3-pounder gun for trial. Later increased in bore to 5-pounder, the design performed successfully with respect to both range and accuracy. Over the next three years he developed his system of construction and adapted it to guns of heavier calibre.

Armstrong's system was adopted in 1858, initially for "special service in the field" and initially he only produced smaller artillery pieces, 6-pounder (2.5 in/64 mm) mountain or light field guns, 9-pounder (3 in/76 mm) guns for horse artillery, and 12-pounder (3 inches /76 mm) field guns.

Armstrong did not consider his system suited to heavier guns but higher authorities had him develop a 20-pounder (3.75 inches /95 mm) field & naval gun, a 40-pounder siege gun, and a 110-pounder (7 inches /180 mm) heavy gun. The Royal Navy used all these guns and all except the 20-pounder saw service in New Zealand.

Armstrong breech-loading system

Armstrong's guns used a "built-up" construction, comprising a central "A" tube (initially of wrought iron, and from 1863 of mild steel toughened in oil) holding the bore over which were shrunk several wrought iron coils which kept the central tube under compression, a breech-piece, and a trunnion ring. The guns' rifling was on the "polygroove" system; the bore of the gun had 38 grooves along its length with a twist of one turn per 38 calibres.

The cast iron shell, similar in shape to a Minié ball, had a thin lead coating which made it fractionally larger than the gun's bore and which engaged with the gun's rifling grooves to impart spin to the shell. This system had just been developed by Martin von Wahrendorff and Giovanni Cavalli in Sweden. This spin, together with the elimination of windage as a result of the tight fit, enabled the gun to achieve greater range and accuracy than existing smoothbore muzzle-loaders with a smaller powder charge.

On top of each gunpowder cartridge was a "lubricator" consisting of tallow and linseed oil between two tin plates, backed by a felt wad coated with beeswax and finally by millboard. The lubricator followed the shell down the bore, the lubricant was squeezed out between the tin plates and the wad behind it cleaned out any lead deposits left from the shell coating leaving the bore clean for the next round.

An innovative feature which is more usually associated with 20th-century guns was what Armstrong called its "grip", which was essentially a squeeze bore; the 6 inches of the bore at the muzzle end was of slightly smaller diameter, which centered the shell before it left the barrel and at the same time slightly swaged down its lead coating, reducing its diameter and slightly improving its ballistic qualities.

The Armstrong breech loaders used a vertical sliding block, called a vent-piece, which had a conical copper-ringed plug on its front surface which sealed the firing chamber, to close the breech. To hold both block and plug tightly in place the guns used a hollow breech screw (hence the name "screw breech") behind the block, which the gunner rotated to tighten and seal the breech before firing.

To load and fire the gun:
 The breech screw was turned to loosen it
 The vent-piece was raised
 The shell was inserted through the hollow breech-screw and rammed home into the bore
 The powder cartridge was inserted through the breech-screw into the chamber
 A primer tube was inserted into the vent piece (only necessary for the 40-pounder and 110-pounder due to the size)
 The vent-piece was lowered
 The breech-screw was tightened
 A friction tube with lanyard attached was inserted in the hole at the top of the vent-piece
 The gunner pulled the lanyard which ignited a gunpowder charge in the vent tube, the flash passed through the vent in the vent-piece, assisted by the primer if present, into the powder chamber and ignited the gunpowder charge

Armstrong guns in action
The British used Armstrong guns extensively to great effect in the Second Opium War.  As reported by the translator Robert Swinhoe, after the British attack on the Chinese fort at Pehtang:

Numbers of dead Chinese lay about the guns, some most fearfully lacerated.  The wall afforded very little protection to the Tartar gunners, and it was astonishing how they managed to stand so long against the destructive fire that our Armstrongs poured on them; but I observed, in more instances than one, that the unfortunate creatures had been tied to the guns by the legs.
The Armstrong gun—mainly the 12 pounder—was used extensively in the 1863 conflict in New Zealand between British troops and Maori in the Waikato. A well preserved 12-pounder which was used in the battle of Rangiriri is at the Te Awamutu museum. The barrel can traverse 6 degrees left or right without moving the gun carriage. The wheels are wooden with a 75 mm wide steel band. The wheel diameter is 1.7 m. The track width is 1.8 m. Barrel width at the muzzle is 140 mm. Such was the confidence of the army in the accuracy of the gun that at the battle of Hairini Ridge the artillery was fired over the heads of the advancing infantry as they stormed the ridge. The infantry took cover in a slight depression in the ground in front of the Maori trenches and then stormed the trenches when the shelling stopped.

On July 4, 1868, Armstrong guns were used at the Battle of Ueno by forces supporting the Imperial government of Japan.

Armstrong guns were used against British and Indian troops during the Second Anglo-Afghan War in the Battle of Charasiab, in which Howard Hensman describes six being captured by a combined Anglo-Indian expedition under the command of Brigadier-General Baker.

Return to muzzle-loading guns

In 1863 an Ordnance Select committee met to consider the merits of muzzle-loading and breech-loading guns. In 1864, even before they had concluded their investigations, the Government stopped the manufacture of Armstrong breech-loaders. When the Committee finally reported, in August 1865, they announced that:

Their report did admit that Armstrong's guns, while more expensive, were undoubtedly safer in that while it was not uncommon for cast iron muzzle-loaders to burst, not one Armstrong gun had ever done so.  (Furthermore, gunners could clear a hang fire from the breech; when the RML 17.72 inch gun at Napier of Magdala Battery at Gibraltar hung fire, a gunner had to be lowered head-first down the bore to attach an extractor to the shell.)

Despite a further report which remarked on the advantages of breech-loaders, cost dominated the proceedings and the Committee finally announced that "The balance of advantages is in favour of muzzle-loading field guns", and in 1865 Britain reverted from breech-loading ordnance to muzzle-loading.

Tests conducted in 1859 with the Armstrong 40-pounder, and again in 1869 with the Armstrong rifled 100-pounder had demonstrated that neither rifled cannon was capable of penetrating 4 inches of armour, even at as little as 50 yards. This was crucial because Britain, as a maritime power, relied for its security on the ability of its naval ordnance to defeat any new armour-protected warships being developed by potential enemy powers.

Armstrong developed an alternative horizontal sliding wedge version of his breechloader, for 40-pounder and 64-pounder guns, in an attempt to address the limitations of the screw breech, but the Government had already decided to return to muzzle-loading guns.

To allow rifling to be used with muzzle-loaders, Armstrong proposed in 1866 a new system whereby the shells had studs on the outside, which aligned with grooves in the barrel of the cannon. This was adopted by the Government for the first generation of rifled muzzle-loaders, termed "RML", together with Armstrong's built-up wrought-iron construction method, which was considered sound.

Later Armstrong breechloaders

Armstrong returned to the manufacture of breechloaders in the 1880s, using an interrupted thread breech with its own "Armstrong cup" and later the de Bange methods of sealing the bore which relied upon the power of the gun's firing to effect the gas seal ("obturation") rather than the manual labour in the 1858 design. It was a major supplier of modern "BL" guns to the Royal Navy, British Army and the world export market until the 1920s. However, it is its earlier generations of "RBL" guns that are typically referred to as "Armstrong guns".

See also
 Rifled breech loader
 Disappearing gun for the Armstrong Disappearing Gun.

Notes

References
Treatise on Ammunition. War Office, UK, 1877
Alexander Lyman Holley, "A Treatise on Ordnance and Armor" published by D Van Nostrand, New York, 1865

Further reading 
 Jack Beeching, The Chinese Opium Wars (1975),

External links

 Friedrich Engels, ""On Rifled Cannon", articles from the New York Tribune, April, May and June, 1860, reprinted in Military Affairs 21, no. 4 (Winter 1957) ed. Morton Borden, 193–198.

1858 introductions
Field artillery
Coastal artillery
Naval guns of the United Kingdom
Scotswood
Victorian-era weapons of the United Kingdom